is a 2012 single by No Name. It reached the third place at the Oricon Weekly Singles Chart in the week of 30 July to 5 August 2012. It has sold around 47,000 copies. It is the opening song for the anime television series AKB0048.

Tracking listing

References

2012 singles
AKB48
Japanese-language songs
Japanese songs
Songs with lyrics by Yasushi Akimoto
2012 songs
King Records (Japan) singles